The Sangruntau oil shale deposit is an oil-shale deposit in Navoi Region, Uzbekistan. The reserves are estimated to reach up to 47 billion metric tons.

In 2010, Uzbekneftegaz started a process to develop the deposit.  The plan foresees at the first stage construction of two Galoter-type shale oil extraction plants, designed by Russian AtomEnergoProekt.  The first plant has the capacity to process 8 million tons of oil shale and produce one million tons of oil per year.  At the second stage the number of plants will be increased to eight.  The residual heat of the process and produces oil-shale gas will be used for electricity production at the 120-MW facility.  However, in December 2015 Uzbekneftegaz announced a postponement of the project.

The deposit is developed by Uzbekneftegaz in cooperation with Japan Oil, Gas and Metals National Corporation and a number of Korean companies.  Second joint venture between Uzbekneftegaz, JGC Corporation and Technopian Corporation plans to extract metals from oil shale.

References

Oil shale in Uzbekistan
JGC Corporation